The Albanian Joint Forces Command, consists in the branch of the Albanian Armed Forces charged with protecting the territorial integrity of Albania. The Command has under the proper structure the Rapid Reaction Brigade, the Special Operations Battalion (Albania), the Albanian Air Force, the Albanian Naval Defense Forces and the Area Support Brigade.

History
Albania requested a Defense Assessment from the United States in coordination with NATO (Allied Command Transformation) and NATO Headquarter Tirana, early in 2006 in order to ensure that previous reform efforts were proceeding well and to provide for course corrections if needed. Conclusions of this work encouraged both Ministry of Defence and General Staff of AAF to continue refining force structure and reducing the size of the Armed Forces by reducing staffs and removing obsolete units making the resultant force more capable and affordable.

A major element of this restructure process was the development of a Joint Forces Command. This streamlined the command and the control of operational units, by contributing more effectively to NATO led Peace Support Operations.

Another key element of this restructuring was the consolidation of almost all units under three major commands; the Joint Forces Command, the Albanian Training and Doctrine Command, and the Albanian Logistic Support Command, thus enhancing supervision of subordinate units and reducing the span of control of the General Staff.

Basic History
In 1999, (based on the old structure The Albanian Land Forces were the main Albanian Armed Forces battle component), the AAF were in alert due to a possible military confrontation with Yugoslavia over the contested territory of Kosovo. Previous preparations during the 90's, included the purchase of the Chinese antitank missile HJ-8, and the antiaircraft HN-5, an improved version of the Russian SA-7. During the 1998-1999 Kosovo War a vast part of the Albanian Armed Forces were deployed along the Albanian-Yugoslavian border.

Developments

The Albanian Land Forces used to field more than 721 Type 59 Main Battle Tanks and 130 M113 Armoured Personnel Carriers. Most of the Cold War-era equipment from the Soviet Union and China has been retired or put in storage, some has been scrapped or sold off. With the new structure, the Albanian Armed Forces does not keep any main battle tanks on active duty although there are some in reserve. Anti-tank weaponry, also combined with Helicopter capability will be the priority.
Albania is now a member of NATO and procedures for the acquisition of a new APC in order to achieve the standards required for troop training are underway to achieve the necessary compatibility with NATO equipment standards.

Weapons

Small arms
TT-33 Main service sidearm
Makarov PM Used by National Guard
Beretta 92 Used by special forces
MP5 Used by special forces
MP7 Used by special forces
AK-47 service rifleMain
AKM Main service rifle
Type 56 Main service rifle
HK G36 Used by special forces
ARX-160 Used by Albanian troops in Afghanistan
Heckler & Koch HK416 Evaluation only
HK 417 Used as sniper by special forces
Dragunov SVD Main service sniper
RPK Main service LMG
DShKM Being withdrawn from service
DP-27 Being withdrawn from service
PKM Moderately used
KPVT Being withdrawn from service
ZU-23-2 Main service AA gun
HN-5 Being withdrawn from service
RPG-7 Main service AT weapon
HJ-8 Moderately used
SG-43

Artillery
Type 67 Main service mortar
M-46 100 Type 59-1
D-20 Chinese and Soviet manufactured
D-1 Being withdrawn from service
ML-20 Withdrawn from service
M-30 Withdrawn from service
D-44 Main service field gun

Vehicles
BMP-1
BMP-2
BTR-50
BTR-152
BRDM-2
Humvee
Iveco VM 90
T-55
M113

Manpower and equipment
As of 2005, the Land Forces Command had:
 16,000 + active personnel and 35,000 reserves:.
On 2010 the Joint Forces Command authorized personnel strength will be approximately 8,200. (With the new structure, the 5 Reserve Brigades have been deactivated)

Structure

See also
 Military of Albania
 Albanian Air Force
 Albanian Naval Defense Forces

References

External links
 Land Forces Command
 Ministry of Defence of Albania (official site)
 Centre for SouthEast European Studies: Albanias Armed Forces- 2002 Data
 Demilitarization of Albania- Equipment destroyed in 2004

Military of Albania